Stelios Pozoglou (born 22 January 1996) is a Greek professional footballer who plays as a winger.

Club career

PAOK
Pozoglou made his debut with PAOK in the Greek Football Cup during the 2013–14 Greek Football Cup, participating in the win against Anagennisi Karditsa F.C. on 30 October 2013. On 12 December 2013 he scored deep into injury time in the UEFA Europa League match against AZ Alkmaar to draw the match level at 2-2. This goal made him, at the age of 17, the youngest player ever to score for PAOK in European competitions. In October 2014 he extended his contract with PAOK for 4 years.

On 8 January 2019, Pozoglou joined Thesprotos. On 21 July 2019, he joined Olympiacos Volos for an undisclosed fee. On 29 January 2020, Pozoglou joined Veria.

References

External links
PAOK FC
Taxalia

1996 births
Living people
Greek footballers
Greek expatriate footballers
Super League Greece players
Cypriot First Division players
PAOK FC players
Karmiotissa FC players
Panserraikos F.C. players
Veria NFC players
Expatriate footballers in Cyprus
Greek expatriates in Cyprus
Association football wingers
Ethnikos Achna FC players
Footballers from Thessaloniki